Eugene Paul "E. P." Wigner (November 17, 1902 – January 1, 1995) was a Hungarian-American theoretical physicist who also contributed to mathematical physics. He received the Nobel Prize in Physics in 1963 "for his contributions to the theory of the atomic nucleus and the elementary particles, particularly through the discovery and application of fundamental symmetry principles".

A graduate of the Technical University of Berlin, Wigner worked as an assistant to Karl Weissenberg and Richard Becker at the Kaiser Wilhelm Institute in Berlin, and David Hilbert at the University of Göttingen. Wigner and Hermann Weyl were responsible for introducing group theory into physics, particularly the theory of symmetry in physics. Along the way he performed ground-breaking work in pure mathematics, in which he authored a number of mathematical theorems. In particular, Wigner's theorem is a cornerstone in the mathematical formulation of quantum mechanics. He is also known for his research into the structure of the atomic nucleus. In 1930, Princeton University recruited Wigner, along with John von Neumann, and he moved to the United States, where he obtained citizenship in 1937.

Wigner participated in a meeting with Leo Szilard and Albert Einstein that resulted in the Einstein–Szilard letter, which prompted President Franklin D. Roosevelt to initiate the Manhattan Project to develop atomic bombs. Wigner was afraid that the German nuclear weapon project would develop an atomic bomb first. During the Manhattan Project, he led a team whose task was to design nuclear reactors to convert uranium into weapons grade plutonium. At the time, reactors existed only on paper, and no reactor had yet gone critical. Wigner was disappointed that DuPont was given responsibility for the detailed design of the reactors, not just their construction. He became Director of Research and Development at the Clinton Laboratory (now the Oak Ridge National Laboratory) in early 1946, but became frustrated with bureaucratic interference by the Atomic Energy Commission, and returned to Princeton.

In the postwar period, he served on a number of government bodies, including the National Bureau of Standards from 1947 to 1951, the mathematics panel of the National Research Council from 1951 to 1954, the physics panel of the National Science Foundation, and the influential General Advisory Committee of the Atomic Energy Commission from 1952 to 1957 and again from 1959 to 1964. In later life, he became more philosophical, and published The Unreasonable Effectiveness of Mathematics in the Natural Sciences, his best-known work outside technical mathematics and physics.

Early life

Wigner Jenő Pál was born in Budapest, Austria-Hungary on November 17, 1902, to middle class Jewish parents, Elisabeth Elsa Einhorn and Antal Anton Wigner, a leather tanner. He had an older sister, Berta, known as Biri, and a younger sister Margit, known as Manci, who later married British theoretical physicist Paul Dirac. He was home schooled by a professional teacher until the age of 9, when he started school at the third grade. During this period, Wigner developed an interest in mathematical problems. At the age of 11, Wigner contracted what his doctors believed to be tuberculosis. His parents sent him to live for six weeks in a sanatorium in the Austrian mountains, before the doctors concluded that the diagnosis was mistaken.

Wigner's family was Jewish, but not religiously observant, and his Bar Mitzvah was a secular one. From 1915 through 1919, he studied at the secondary grammar school called Fasori Evangélikus Gimnázium, the school his father had attended. Religious education was compulsory, and he attended classes in Judaism taught by a rabbi. A fellow student was János von Neumann, who was a year behind Wigner. They both benefited from the instruction of the noted mathematics teacher László Rátz. In 1919, to escape the Béla Kun communist regime, the Wigner family briefly fled to Austria, returning to Hungary after Kun's downfall. Partly as a reaction to the prominence of Jews in the Kun regime, the family converted to Lutheranism. Wigner explained later in his life that his family decision to convert to Lutheranism "was not at heart a religious decision but an anti-communist one". Regarding religion, Wigner was an atheist.

After graduating from the secondary school in 1920, Wigner enrolled at the Budapest University of Technical Sciences, known as the Műegyetem. He was not happy with the courses on offer,  and in 1921 enrolled at the Technische Hochschule Berlin (now Technical University of Berlin), where he studied chemical engineering.  He also attended the Wednesday afternoon colloquia of the German Physical Society. These colloquia featured leading researchers including Max Planck, Max von Laue, Rudolf Ladenburg, Werner Heisenberg, Walther Nernst, Wolfgang Pauli, and Albert Einstein. Wigner also met the physicist Leó Szilárd, who at once became Wigner's closest friend. A third experience in Berlin was formative. Wigner worked at the Kaiser Wilhelm Institute for Physical Chemistry and Electrochemistry (now the Fritz Haber Institute), and there he met Michael Polanyi, who became, after László Rátz, Wigner's greatest teacher. Polanyi supervised Wigner's DSc thesis, Bildung und Zerfall von Molekülen ("Formation and Decay of Molecules").

Middle years
Wigner returned to Budapest, where he went to work at his father's tannery, but in 1926, he accepted an offer from Karl Weissenberg at the Kaiser Wilhelm Institute in Berlin. Weissenberg wanted someone to assist him with his work on x-ray crystallography, and Polanyi had recommended Wigner. After six months as Weissenberg's assistant, Wigner went to work for Richard Becker for two semesters. Wigner explored quantum mechanics, studying the work of Erwin Schrödinger. He also delved into the group theory of Ferdinand Frobenius and  Eduard Ritter von Weber.

Wigner received a request from Arnold Sommerfeld to work at the University of Göttingen as an assistant to the great mathematician David Hilbert. This proved a disappointment, as the aged Hilbert's abilities were failing, and his interests had shifted to logic. Wigner nonetheless studied independently. He laid the foundation for the theory of symmetries in quantum mechanics and in 1927 introduced what is now known as the Wigner D-matrix. Wigner and Hermann Weyl were responsible for introducing group theory into quantum mechanics. The latter had written a standard text, Group Theory and Quantum Mechanics (1928), but it was not easy to understand, especially for younger physicists. Wigner's Group Theory and Its Application to the Quantum Mechanics of Atomic Spectra (1931) made group theory accessible to a wider audience.

In these works, Wigner laid the foundation for the theory of symmetries in quantum mechanics.  Wigner's theorem proved by Wigner in 1931, is a cornerstone of the mathematical formulation of quantum mechanics. The theorem specifies how physical symmetries such as rotations, translations, and CPT symmetry are represented on the Hilbert space of states. According to the theorem, any symmetry transformation is represented by a linear and unitary or antilinear and antiunitary transformation of Hilbert space. The representation of a symmetry group on a Hilbert space is either an ordinary representation or a projective representation.

In the late 1930s, Wigner extended his research into atomic nuclei. By 1929, his papers were drawing notice in the world of physics. In 1930, Princeton University recruited Wigner for a one-year lectureship, at 7 times the salary that he had been drawing in Europe. Princeton recruited von Neumann at the same time.  Jenő Pál Wigner and János von Neumann had collaborated on three papers together in 1928 and two in 1929. They anglicized their first names to "Eugene" and "John", respectively. When their year was up, Princeton offered a five-year contract as visiting professors for half the year. The Technische Hochschule responded with a teaching assignment for the other half of the year. This was very timely, since the Nazis soon rose to power in Germany. At Princeton in 1934, Wigner introduced his sister Margit "Manci" Wigner to the physicist Paul Dirac, with whom she remarried.

Princeton did not rehire Wigner when his contract ran out in 1936. Through Gregory Breit, Wigner found new employment at the University of Wisconsin. There, he met his first wife, Amelia Frank, who was a physics student there. However, she died unexpectedly in 1937, leaving Wigner distraught. He therefore accepted a 1938 offer from Princeton to return there. Wigner became a naturalized citizen of the United States on January 8, 1937, and he brought his parents to the United States.

Manhattan Project

Although he was a professed political amateur, on August 2, 1939, he participated in a meeting with Leó Szilárd and Albert Einstein that resulted in the Einstein–Szilárd letter, which prompted President Franklin D. Roosevelt to initiate the Manhattan Project to develop atomic bombs. Wigner was afraid that the German nuclear weapon project would develop an atomic bomb first, and even refused to have his fingerprints taken because they could be used to track him down if Germany won. "Thoughts of being murdered," he later recalled, "focus your mind wonderfully."

On June 4, 1941, Wigner married his second wife, Mary Annette Wheeler, a professor of physics at Vassar College, who had completed her Ph.D. at Yale University in 1932. After the war she taught physics on the faculty of Rutgers University's Douglass College in New Jersey until her retirement in 1964. They remained married until her death in November 1977. They had two children, David Wigner and Martha Wigner Upton.

During the Manhattan Project, Wigner led a team that included J. Ernest Wilkins Jr., Alvin M. Weinberg, Katharine Way, Gale Young and Edward Creutz. The group's task was to design the production nuclear reactors that would convert uranium into weapons grade plutonium.  At the time, reactors existed only on paper, and no reactor had yet gone critical. In July 1942, Wigner chose a conservative 100 MW design, with a graphite neutron moderator and water cooling. Wigner was present at a converted rackets court under the stands at the University of Chicago's abandoned Stagg Field on December 2, 1942, when the world's first atomic reactor, Chicago Pile One (CP-1) achieved a controlled nuclear chain reaction.

Wigner was disappointed that DuPont was given responsibility for the detailed design of the reactors, not just their construction. He threatened to resign in February 1943, but was talked out of it by the head of the Metallurgical Laboratory, Arthur Compton, who sent him on vacation instead. As it turned out, a design decision by DuPont to give the reactor additional load tubes for more uranium saved the project when neutron poisoning became a problem. Without the additional tubes, the reactor could have been run at 35% power until the boron impurities in the graphite were burned up and enough plutonium produced to run the reactor at full power; but this would have set the project back a year. During the 1950s, he would even work for DuPont on the Savannah River Site. Wigner did not regret working on the Manhattan Project, and sometimes wished the atomic bomb had been ready a year earlier.

An important discovery Wigner made during the project was the Wigner effect. This is a swelling of the graphite moderator caused by the displacement of atoms by neutron radiation. The Wigner effect was a serious problem for the reactors at the Hanford Site in the immediate post-war period, and resulted in production cutbacks and a reactor being shut down entirely. It was eventually discovered that it could be overcome by controlled heating and annealing.

Through Manhattan project funding, Wigner and Leonard Eisenbud  also developed an important general approach to nuclear reactions, the Wigner–Eisenbud R-matrix theory, which was published in 1947.

Later years
Wigner accepted a position as the Director of Research and Development at the Clinton Laboratory (now the Oak Ridge National Laboratory) in Oak Ridge, Tennessee in early 1946. Because he did not want to be involved in administrative duties, he became co-director of the laboratory, with James Lum handling the administrative chores as executive director. When the newly created Atomic Energy Commission (AEC) took charge of the laboratory's operations at the start of 1947, Wigner feared that many of the technical decisions would be made in Washington. He also saw the Army's continuation of wartime security policies at the laboratory as a "meddlesome oversight", interfering with research. One such incident occurred in March 1947, when the AEC discovered that Wigner's scientists were conducting experiments with a critical mass of uranium-235 when the Director of the Manhattan Project, Major General Leslie R. Groves, Jr., had forbidden such experiments in August 1946 after the death of Louis Slotin at the Los Alamos Laboratory. Wigner argued that Groves's order had been superseded, but was forced to terminate the experiments, which were completely different from the one that killed Slotin.

Feeling unsuited to a managerial role in such an environment, he left Oak Ridge in 1947 and returned to Princeton University, although he maintained a consulting role with the facility for many years. In the postwar period, he served on a number of government bodies, including the National Bureau of Standards from 1947 to 1951, the mathematics panel of the National Research Council from 1951 to 1954, the physics panel of the National Science Foundation, and the influential General Advisory Committee of the Atomic Energy Commission from 1952 to 1957 and again from 1959 to 1964. He also contributed to civil defense.

Near the end of his life, Wigner's thoughts turned more philosophical. In 1960, he published a now classic article on the philosophy of mathematics and of physics, which has become his best-known work outside technical mathematics and physics, "The Unreasonable Effectiveness of Mathematics in the Natural Sciences". He argued that biology and cognition could be the origin of physical concepts, as we humans perceive them, and that the happy coincidence that mathematics and physics were so well matched, seemed to be "unreasonable" and hard to explain. His original paper has provoked and inspired many responses across a wide range of disciplines. These included Richard Hamming in Computer Science, Arthur Lesk in Molecular Biology, Peter Norvig in data mining,  Max Tegmark in Physics, Ivor Grattan-Guinness in Mathematics, and Vela Velupillai in Economics.

Turning to philosophical questions about the theory of quantum mechanics, Wigner developed a thought experiment (later called Wigner's Friend paradox) to illustrate his belief that consciousness is foundational to the quantum mechanical measurement process. He thereby followed an ontological approach that sets human's consciousness at the center: "All that quantum mechanics purports to provide are probability connections between subsequent impressions (also called 'apperceptions') of the consciousness".

Measurements are understood as the interactions which create the impressions in our consciousness (and as a result modify the wave function of the "measured" physical system), an idea which has been called the "consciousness causes collapse" interpretation.

Interestingly, Hugh Everett III (a student of Wigner) discussed Wigner's thought experiment in the introductory part of his 1957 dissertation as an "amusing, but extremely hypothetical drama". In an early draft of Everett's work, one also finds a drawing of the Wigner's Friend situation, which must be seen as the first evidence on paper of the thought experiment that was later assigned to be Wigner's. This suggests that Everett must at least have discussed the problem together with Wigner. 

In November 1963, Wigner called for the allocation of 10% of the national defense budget to be spent on nuclear blast shelters and survival resources, arguing that such an expenditure would be less costly than disarmament. Wigner considered a recent Woods Hole study's conclusion that a nuclear strike would kill 20% of Americans to be a very modest projection and that the country could recover from such an attack more quickly than Germany had recovered from the devastation of World War II.

Wigner was awarded the Nobel Prize in Physics in 1963 "for his contributions to the theory of the atomic nucleus and the elementary particles, particularly through the discovery and application of fundamental symmetry principles". The prize was shared that year, with the other half of the award divided between Maria Goeppert-Mayer and J. Hans D. Jensen. Wigner professed that he had never considered the possibility that this might occur, and added: "I never expected to get my name in the newspapers without doing something wicked." He also won the Franklin Medal in 1950, the Enrico Fermi award in 1958, the Atoms for Peace Award in 1959, the Max Planck Medal in 1961, the National Medal of Science in 1969, the Albert Einstein Award in 1972, the Golden Plate Award of the American Academy of Achievement in 1974, and the eponymous Wigner Medal in 1978. In 1968 he gave the Josiah Willard Gibbs lecture.

Mary died in November 1977. In 1979, Wigner married his third wife, Eileen Clare-Patton (Pat) Hamilton, the widow of physicist Donald Ross Hamilton, the Dean of the Graduate School at Princeton University, who had died in 1972. In 1992, at the age of 90, he published his memoirs, The Recollections of Eugene P. Wigner with Andrew Szanton. In it, Wigner said: "The full meaning of life, the collective meaning of all human desires, is fundamentally a mystery beyond our grasp. As a young man, I chafed at this state of affairs. But by now I have made peace with it. I even feel a certain honor to be associated with such a mystery." In his collection of essays 'Philosophical Reflections and Syntheses' (1995), he commented: "It was not possible to formulate the laws of quantum mechanics in a fully consistent way without reference to consciousness."

Wigner was credited as a member of the advisory board for the Western Goals Foundation, a private domestic intelligence agency created in the US in 1979 to "fill the critical gap caused by the crippling of the FBI, the disabling of the House Un-American Activities Committee and the destruction of crucial government files".

Wigner died of pneumonia at the University Medical Center in Princeton, New Jersey on 1 January 1995. He was survived by his wife Eileen (died 2010) and children Erika, David and Martha, and his sisters Bertha and Margit.

Publications
 1958 (with Alvin M. Weinberg). Physical Theory of Neutron Chain Reactors University of Chicago Press. 
 1959. Group Theory and its Application to the Quantum Mechanics of Atomic Spectra. New York: Academic Press. Translation by J. J. Griffin of 1931, Gruppentheorie und ihre Anwendungen auf die Quantenmechanik der Atomspektren, Vieweg Verlag, Braunschweig.
 1970 Symmetries and Reflections: Scientific Essays. Indiana University Press, Bloomington 
 1992 (as told to Andrew Szanton). The Recollections of Eugene P. Wigner. Plenum. 
 1995 (with Jagdish Mehra and Arthur Wightman, eds.). Philosophical Reflections and Syntheses. Springer, Berlin

Selected contributions
Theoretical physics

Bargmann–Wigner equations
Jordan–Wigner transformation
Newton–Wigner localization 
Polynomial Wigner–Ville distribution
Relativistic Breit–Wigner distribution 
Thomas–Wigner rotation 
Wigner–Eckart theorem
Wigner–Inonu contraction  
Wigner–Seitz cell  
Wigner–Seitz radius
Wigner–Weyl transform  
Wigner–Wilkins spectrum   
Wigner's classification

Wigner's friend 
Wigner's theorem
Wigner crystal
Wigner D-matrix
Wigner effect  
Wigner energy  
Wigner lattice
Wigner's disease 
Thomas–Wigner rotation
Von Neumann–Wigner interpretation
Wigner–Witmer correlation rules

Mathematics

Gabor–Wigner transform
Modified Wigner distribution function 
Wigner distribution function
Wigner semicircle distribution
Wigner rotation
Wigner quasi-probability distribution
Wigner semicircle distribution
6-j symbol
9-j symbol
Wigner 3-j symbols
 Wigner–İnönü group contraction
Wigner surmise

See also
 List of things named after Eugene Wigner
 The Martians (scientists)

Notes

References
 
 
 
 N. Mukunda (1995) "Eugene Paul Wigner – A tribute", Current Science 69(4): 375–85

External links

 1964 Audio Interview with Eugene Wigner by Stephane Groueff Voices of the Manhattan Project
 
 
 
 
 
 
 Wigner Jenö Iskolás Évei by Radnai Gyula, ELTE, Fizikai Szemle 2007/2 – 62.o. (Hungarian). Description of the childhood and especially of the school-years in Budapest, with some interesting photos too.
 Interview with Eugene P. Wigner on John von Neumann at the  Charles Babbage Institute, University of Minnesota, Minneapolis – Wigner talks about his association with John von Neumann during their school years in Hungary, their graduate studies in Berlin, and their appointments to Princeton in 1930. Wigner discusses von Neumann's contributions to the theory of quantum mechanics, Wigner's own work in this area, and von Neumann's interest in the application of theory to the atomic bomb project.
 
  including the Nobel Lecture, December 12, 1963 Events, Laws of Nature, and Invariance Principles

1902 births
1995 deaths
Nobel laureates in Physics
American Nobel laureates
Hungarian Nobel laureates
Austro-Hungarian Nobel laureates
20th-century Hungarian mathematicians
American atheists
Jewish atheists
American Lutherans
20th-century American physicists
American people of Hungarian-Jewish descent
Atoms for Peace Award recipients
Technical University of Berlin alumni
Burials at Princeton Cemetery
Enrico Fermi Award recipients
Fasori Gimnázium alumni
Fellows of the American Physical Society
Foreign Members of the Royal Society
Hungarian emigrants to the United States
Hungarian atheists
Hungarian Jews
Hungarian Lutherans
20th-century Hungarian physicists
Hungarian nuclear physicists
Jewish American scientists
Jewish physicists
Manhattan Project people
Mathematical physicists
Members of the United States National Academy of Sciences
National Medal of Science laureates
Oak Ridge National Laboratory people
People from Pest, Hungary
Princeton University faculty
Theoretical physicists
Academic staff of the University of Göttingen
University of Wisconsin–Madison faculty
Winners of the Max Planck Medal
Austro-Hungarian mathematicians
Deaths from pneumonia in New Jersey
People with acquired American citizenship
Presidents of the American Physical Society